Pierre Alexandre (born 1922 in Algiers; died in 1994), was a French anthropologist and linguist.

Biography
Born Pierre Hippolyte Henri Charles Alexandre in Algiers, he spent his childhood in mainland France. Alexandre studied at the Lycée Carnot in Paris. In 1943, he qualified for entry into the École nationale de la France d'Outre-Mer.

He was a colonial administrator in Cameroon and Togo. After the colonies gained independence, he returned to Paris, where he became lecturer at INALCO and taught Bantu languages.

References

External links
In Memoriam

1922 births
1994 deaths
Linguists from France
French anthropologists
French Africanists
20th-century anthropologists
20th-century linguists
French people of colonial Algeria